The Crock of Gold is a comic novel written by Irish author James Stephens, first published in 1912.

A mixture of philosophy, Irish folklore and the "battle of the sexes", it consists of six books, Book 1 – The Coming of Pan, Book 2 – The Philosopher's Journey, Book 3 – The Two Gods, Book 4 – The Philosopher's Return, Book 5 – The Policemen, Book 6 – The Thin Woman's Journey, that rotate around a philosopher and his quest to find the most beautiful woman in the world, Cáitilin Ni Murrachu, daughter of a remote mountain farm, and deliver her from the gods Pan and Aengus Óg, while himself going through a catharsis.

The Philosopher is arrested for murder after the neighbouring Leprecauns of Gort na Clocha Mora (whose crock of gold has been taken) lay information with the police that the two friends who shared the Philosopher's house have died, with the implication that they have been killed. "It is in circumstances such as these that dangerous alliances are made," wrote Stephens, "and, for the first time in history, the elemental beings invoked bourgeois assistance."

The Philosopher is then whisked away by his wife the Thin Woman of Inis Magrath (who herself belongs to the most powerful Shee of Ireland). The Philosopher and the Thin Woman of Inis Magrath encounter notable characters on their separate journeys, in his case Angus Óg, and in hers the Three Infinites.

The Crock of Gold demonstrates Stephens' eye for beautiful detail. For example, an encounter between a donkey and a spider is described in the following way:

"Does anybody ever kick you in the nose?" said the ass to him.
"Ay does there," said the spider; "you and your like that are always walking on me, or lying down on me, or running over me with the wheels of a cart."
"Well, why don't you stay on the wall?" said the ass.
"Sure, my wife is there," replied the spider.
"What's the harm in that?" said the ass.
"She'd eat me," said the spider, "and, anyhow, the competition on the wall is dreadful, and the flies are getting wiser and timider every season. Have you got a wife yourself, now?"
"I have not," said the ass; "I wish I had."
"You like your wife for the first while," said the spider, "and after that you hate her."
"If I had the first while I'd chance the second while," replied the ass.
"It's bachelor's talk," said the spider; "all the same, we can't keep away from them," and so saying he began to move all his legs at once in the direction of the wall. "You can only die once," said he.

A later edition, published by the Macmillan Company in 1922 was issued with fanciful drawings by American artist Wilfred Jones (Illustrator, 1888 - 1968). A 1926 edition featured illustrations by Thomas Mackenzie (illustrator). Arthur Rackham was to have illustrated the book, but died in 1939 before he could.

Some editions have a foreword by Walter de la Mare.

Reception
Dave Langford reviewed The Crock of Gold for White Dwarf #84, and stated that "Bag this for your shelf of fantasy classics: it may go out of print for further decades."

References

External links
 
 The Crock of Gold in its 1912 edition, downloadable from the Internet Archive
 
 The Crock of Gold by James Stephens at Project Gutenberg

Irish fairy tales
Irish fantasy novels
Philosophical novels
1912 novels
20th-century Irish novels